Aetius is a genus of Asian corinnid sac spiders, first described by Octavius Pickard-Cambridge in 1897.  it contains only three species.

References 

Corinnidae
Araneomorphae genera